The Bahraini national ice hockey team is the national ice hockey team of Bahrain.

History
Bahrain played its first game in a 2010 exhibition game against Kuwait in which they lost, 10–3. The following year, Bahrain competed in the Premier Division of the 2011 Asian Winter Games. In the first two games they were beaten by Malaysia (25–0) and by Thailand (29–0). They finished the tournament losing all six of their games and placing last on the table. In 2012, Bahrain competed in the 2012 Gulf Ice Hockey Championship. The team finished last after losing the bronze medal game against Oman.

International competitions

Asian Winter Games

GCC Gulf Championship

Roster
From the 2011 Asian Winter Games

All-time record against other nations
As of August 11, 2016

References

National ice hockey teams in Asia
Ice hockey
National ice hockey teams in the Arab world